Paul Shmyr (January 18, 1946 – September 2, 2004) was a Canadian professional ice hockey defenceman who played in the World Hockey Association (WHA) and National Hockey League (NHL). He featured in the 1971 Stanley Cup Finals with the Chicago Black Hawks and the 1981 Stanley Cup Finals with the Minnesota North Stars.

Playing career
Shmyr was one of the top defensive stars in the short history of the WHA, noted for his hard-nosed play, having jumped from the NHL's California Golden Seals to the upstart Cleveland Crusaders. He played four seasons for Cleveland, garnering the league's top defenceman trophy in 1976. He subsequently played for the WHA's San Diego Mariners, where he enjoyed his best offensive campaign, and played two years for the Edmonton Oilers, captaining the club to a regular season league championship in the WHA's final season. As captain, he elected to wear a Cyrillic "К" instead of the customary captain's "C" due to his Ukrainian heritage.

After the WHA folded, the Minnesota North Stars, which owned his rights, reclaimed him, and as a noted leader, was named to captain the North Stars in 1979. While the Stars' captain, he led them to a semifinals appearance in 1980 and to the 1981 Stanley Cup Final, where they lost to the New York Islanders. He then signed with the Hartford Whalers as a free agent in 1981, and retired after one season.

Shmyr was named to the WHA's First All-Star Team in 1973, 1974, and 1976, and to its Second All-Star Team in 1979. He finished third in the WHA's career leaders for games played, twentieth in assists, and fourth in penalty minutes. He represented Canada at the 1974 Summit Series and was one of only two WHAers (the other being Bobby Hull) to be invited to try out for Team Canada at the 1976 Canada Cup, though he failed to make the team.

He was from a hockey-playing family; his younger brother John Shmyr also played in the WHA. Shmyr died of throat cancer in 2004, at the age of 58.

Honours
In 2010, he was elected as an inaugural inductee into the World Hockey Association Hall of Fame.

Career statistics

Regular season and playoffs

International

References

External links
 

1946 births
2004 deaths
California Golden Seals players
Canadian ice hockey defencemen
Deaths from cancer in British Columbia
Chicago Blackhawks players
Cleveland Crusaders players
Dallas Black Hawks players
Deaths from esophageal cancer
Edmonton Oilers (WHA) players
Fort Wayne Komets players
Hartford Whalers players
Ice hockey people from Saskatchewan
Minnesota North Stars players
Portland Buckaroos players
San Diego Mariners players
Vancouver Canucks (WHL) players